The 2014 Harlow District Council election took place on 22 May 2014 to elect members of Harlow District Council in Essex, England. One third of the council was up for election and the Labour Party stayed in overall control of the council.

After the election, the composition of the council was:
Labour 17
Conservative 11
UK Independence Party 5

Background
At the last election in 2012 Labour gained control of Harlow Council from the Conservative Party and finished with 20 councillors compared to 13 for the Conservatives. The Conservative group was reduced in May 2013 when Great Parndon councillor Joshua Jolles resigned from the party to sit as an independent, after being unhappy with having to follow national Conservative policies. Joshua Jolles would go on to found a political party, the Harlow Independent Party, which stood candidates at the 2014 Harlow Council elections.

A total of 47 candidates stood at the election, including full slates from the Conservatives, Labour and UK Independence Party, along with 7 candidates from the Liberal Democrats, 3 from the Harlow Independent Party and 1 other independent. An extra seat was contested in Mark Hall ward after Labour councillor Paul Schroder resigned from the council in April 2014. Another 3 councillors stood down at the election, Mike Garnett, Guy Mitchinson and Paul Sztumpf, while Mark Wilkinson stepped down as council leader at the election.

Election result
Labour remained in control of Harlow council, but with only a 1-seat majority after the UK Independence Party gained 5 seats. The UK Independence Party gains in Bush Fair, Great Parndon, Mark Hall and Staple Tye included taking 3 seats from Labour, 1 from the Conservatives and 1 from the Harlow Independent Party. Meanwhile, Labour retained 4 seats and the Conservatives kept 3 seats to leave Labour with 17 councillors, compared to 11 Conservatives and 5 for the UK Independence Party. Overall turnout at the election was 33.5%.

Following the election Jon Clempner was chosen as the  leader of the Labour group and became the new council leader.

Ward results

Bush Fair

Church Langley

Great Parndon

Harlow Common

Little Parndon and Hare Street

Mark Hall (2 seats)

Netteswell

Old Harlow

Staple Tye

Sumners and Kingsmoor

Toddbrook

By-elections between 2014 and 2015
A by-election was held in Mark Hall ward on 12 February 2015 following the resignation of UK Independence Party councillor Jerry Crawford due to illness. The seat was gained for Labour by Danny Purton with a majority of 233 votes over UK Independence Party candidate Mark Gough, increasing the number of Labour councillors to 18, compared to 11 Conservatives and 4 for the UK Independence Party.

References

Harlow District Council elections
2014 English local elections
2010s in Essex